Adolf of the Rhine (27 September 1300, Wolfratshausen – 29 January 1327, Neustadt) from the house of Wittelsbach was formally Count Palatine of the Rhine from 1319 to 1327.

He was the second son of Rudolf I, Duke of Bavaria and his wife Mechtild of Nassau. He didn't really rule because his uncle Louis IV occupied the Palatinate until an agreement with Adolf's brothers and his son Rupert II, Elector Palatine of the Rhine was concluded in Pavia in 1329.

Family and children
He was married in 1320 to Countess Irmengard of Oettingen (d. 1399), daughter of Count Louis VI of Oettingen. They had the following children:
 Rupert II, Elector Palatine of the Rhine (12 May 1325, Amberg–6 January 1398, Amberg).
 Adolf.
 Friedrich.
 a daughter (d. 1389), married Count Meinhard I of Ortenburg.

He was buried in the Cistercian monastery Schönau near Heidelberg.

Ancestry

External links
  www.genealogie-mittelalter.de

Wittelsbach, Adolf, Count Palatine of the Rhine
Wittelsbach, Adolf, Count Palatine of the Rhine
House of Wittelsbach
Counts Palatine of the Rhine
Burials at Schönau Abbey
Sons of monarchs